The Continent is a pan-African newspaper launched in 2020. The paper focuses on digital content optimized for digital platforms like WhatsApp. The Continent is based in South Africa.

Anchoring start (2022) 

Online newspapers published in South Africa
Newspapers established in the 2020s
2020 establishments in South Africa
Pan-African media companies